The Embassy of the Czech Republic in London is the diplomatic mission of the Czech Republic in the United Kingdom. It is located at the junction of Kensington Palace Gardens and Bayswater Road in a building it shares with the Embassy of Slovakia.

The Embassy of Czechoslovakia was originally located on Grosvenor Place, before moving to the location of the current Czech and Slovak embassies in 1970. The construction of a new brutalist-style building at this site had begun in 1965 and was undertaken by Jan Bočan, Jan Šrámek and Karel Štěpánský from the atelier Beta Prague Project Institute; it received an award from the Royal Institute of British Architects for the best building in the United Kingdom created by foreign architects. The building was then divided between the Czech Republic and Slovakia following the dissolution of Czechoslovakia in 1993.

Gallery

References

External links
Official site

Czech Republic
Diplomatic missions of the Czech Republic
Czech Republic–United Kingdom relations
Buildings and structures in the Royal Borough of Kensington and Chelsea
Czechoslovakia–United Kingdom relations
Holland Park